Group B of the 2005 Fed Cup Americas Zone Group I was one of two pools in the Americas Zone Group I of the 2005 Fed Cup. Four teams competed in a round robin competition, with the top team and the bottom two teams proceeding to their respective sections of the play-offs: the top teams played for advancement to the World Group II Play-offs, while the bottom teams faced potential relegation to Group II.

Canada vs. Cuba

Brazil vs. Paraguay

Canada vs. Brazil

Cuba vs. Paraguay

Canada vs. Paraguay

Brazil vs. Cuba

See also
Fed Cup structure

References

External links
 Fed Cup website

2005 Fed Cup Americas Zone